Fox Point may refer to:

Fox Point, Newfoundland and Labrador, a settlement in Newfoundland, Canada
Fox Point, Providence, Rhode Island, a neighborhood in Providence, Rhode Island
Fox Point, Wisconsin, a village in, Wisconsin, USA